Sirithanakke Saval (Kannada: ಸಿರಿತನಕ್ಕೇ ಸವಾಲ್) is a 1978 Indian Kannada film, directed by T. R. Ramanna and produced by C. D. Murthy. The film stars Vishnuvardhan, Manjula Vijayakumar, K. S. Ashwath and Sampath in the lead roles. The film has musical score by Vijaya Bhaskar. The film was a remake of the 1971 Tamil film Savaale Samali.

Cast

Vishnuvardhan
Manjula Devi
K. S. Ashwath 
Sampath
Dwarakish
Vajramuni
Leelavathi
Jayashree
Suma
Suchithra
Kashmiri
Halam
CID Shakunthala
Ambareesh in Guest Appearance
Venkataram
Vasanthakumar
Kunigal Ramanath
Jayashankar
Shivashankar Thalageri
Basavaraj

Soundtrack

Reception

References

External links
 

1978 films
1970s Kannada-language films
Films scored by Vijaya Bhaskar
Kannada remakes of Tamil films
Films directed by T. R. Ramanna